Daddio is an American sitcom that aired on NBC from March 23 to October 23, 2000. Created by Matt Berry and Ric Swartzwelder, the series starred Michael Chiklis and Anita Barone.

Synopsis
Michael Chiklis stars as Chris Woods, a former restaurant supply salesman who decides to become a stay-at-home dad to his and his wife Linda's (Barone) four children Shannon (Cristina Kernan), Max (Martin Spanjers), Jake (Mitch Holleman), and Emily to accommodate his wife's demanding career as a lawyer. Chris loves his new role, but is annoyed by Linda's well-meaning friends Holly (Suzy Nakamura) and Barb (Amy Wilson) who constantly interfere with Chris' parenting. Chris is also forced to defend his new role to his best friend Rob (Kevin Crowley), and his new neighbor Bobick (Steve Ryan), a former Marine.

The show's first season consisted of five episodes, but was renewed for a second season of 13 episodes. However, only four were aired before NBC canceled the show in October 2000 due to low ratings.

Cast
 Michael Chiklis as Chris Woods
 Anita Barone as Linda Woods
 Martin Spanjers as Max Woods
 Mitch Holleman as Jake Woods
 Cristina Kernan as Shannon Woods
 Kevin Crowley as Rod Krolak
 Amy Wilson as Barb Krolak
 Christian Boewe as Montgomery Krolak
 Hilary Duff as Molly Kidman (Pilot only)
 Suzy Nakamura as Holly Martin
 Steve Ryan as Bobick

Episodes

Season 1 (2000)

Season 2 (2000)

Awards and nominations

References

External links
 
 

2000 American television series debuts
2000 American television series endings
2000s American sitcoms
English-language television shows
NBC original programming
Television series by ABC Studios